The Royal Navy is the principal naval warfare service branch of the British Armed Forces. As of January 2023, there are 72 commissioned ships in the Royal Navy.

Of the commissioned vessels, twenty-two are major surface combatants (two aircraft carriers, six guided missile destroyers, twelve frigates and two amphibious transport docks) and ten are nuclear-powered submarines (four ballistic missile submarines and six fleet submarines). In addition the Navy possesses nine mine countermeasures vessels, twenty-six patrol vessels, three survey vessels, one icebreaker and one historic warship, . The total displacement of the Royal Navy is approximately 431,000 tonnes.

The Royal Navy operates four bases where commissioned ships are based: HMNB Portsmouth, HMNB Devonport and HMNB Clyde and the Royal Navy's newest base,  in Bahrain. In addition, a number of commissioned vessels belonging to the University Royal Naval Units (URNU) are stationed at various locations around the United Kingdom. Two fast patrol boats, together with a forward-deployed River-class Offshore Patrol Vessel, normally form part of the Gibraltar Squadron and are permanently based there. Four other River-class vessels are forward-deployed: in the Falkland Islands (one ship), the Caribbean (one ship) and the Indo-Pacific region (two ships).

Besides the Royal Navy, the Royal Fleet Auxiliary (RFA) and the Royal Marines operate their own flotillas of vessels which complement the assets of the Royal Navy, however they are not included in this list or the above figures (the Royal Navy and RFA combined have 85 vessels with a total displacement in excess of 772,000 tonnes). In addition, the naval training vessels  and  can be found based at the Royal Navy shore establishment  and the Britannia Royal Naval College, respectively. Non-commissioned Vahana-class workboats are operated by the Royal Navy in several support and training roles, replacing previous P1000-class vessels. As a supporting contingent of His Majesty's Naval Service, the civilian Marine Services operate many auxiliary ships (including coastal logistics, tugs and research vessels) in support of Royal Navy and Royal Fleet Auxiliary operations. (these civilian vessels bring the total displacement of the Navy, RFA and Marine Services ships to greater than 826,400 tonnes).

All ships and submarines currently in commission with the Royal Navy were built in the United Kingdom, with the exceptions of icebreaker  which was built in Norway and survey vessel  which was substantially built in Ireland. All vessels of the Royal Navy bear the ship prefix "HMS", for His Majesty's Ship or His Majesty's Submarine.

Ceremonial/Historic ship

Submarine service

Surface fleet

Auxiliary vessels
Not to be confused with Royal Fleet Auxiliary and vessels operated by Serco Marine Services

Gallery

Silhouettes
Silhouettes of major fleet units:

See also

Lists of ships operated by or in support of His Majesty's Naval Service
List of active Royal Fleet Auxiliary ships
List of active Royal Marines military watercraft
List of ships of Serco Marine Services
Related articles
List of Royal Navy shore establishments (the "stone frigates")
List of ship names of the Royal Navy
Active Royal Navy weapon systems
Future of the Royal Navy
Standing Royal Navy deployments

Footnotes

References

External links
 Royal Navy (royalnavy.mod.uk)
 Royal Navy — The Equipment — Ships (royalnavy.mod.uk)

 Active
United Kingdom